Stephen Robert Gunby (born 14 April 1984, in Lincoln, England) is a retired professional footballer who played as a midfielder for Bury in the Football League.

External links

1984 births
Living people
Sportspeople from Lincoln, England
English footballers
Association football midfielders
Bury F.C. players
Hyde United F.C. players
Leigh Genesis F.C. players
Airbus UK Broughton F.C. players
English Football League players
Knypersley Victoria F.C. players